Jonathan Legris (born 5 November 1987 in Bournemouth, Dorset) is a British racing driver. He has competed in such series as Formula BMW UK, the British Formula Three Championship and the European F3 Open Championship.

References

External links
 Official website
 

1987 births
Living people
English racing drivers
Sportspeople from Bournemouth
Euroformula Open Championship drivers
Asian Formula Three Championship drivers
Formula BMW UK drivers
Formula Palmer Audi drivers

Motaworld Racing drivers
De Villota Motorsport drivers
Mark Burdett Motorsport drivers
Team West-Tec drivers